The 1966–67 Northern Rugby Football League season was the 72nd season of rugby league football in Britain. After Leeds had ended the regular season as league leaders, Wakefield Trinity won their first Championship when they beat St. Helens 21-9 in the Final replay, after a 7-7 draw. The Challenge Cup-winners were Featherstone Rovers who beat Barrow 17-12 in the Wembley final.

Rule changes
Limited tackles:
 The Rugby Football League ended unlimited tackles, introducing a four-tackle rule. The introduction of the "tackle count" in December 1966 meant a team now had a limited number of tackles in which to score before they must surrender possession to their opponents. The limit would remain four until an increase to six tackles in 1972.

Championship

League table

Play-offs

Final
The 1966/67 Championship Final replay was played between Wakefield Trinity and St. Helens on Wednesday, 10 May 1967 at Station Road Ground before a crowd of 33,537.  Wakefield Trinity won 21-9 with their try-scoring scrum half back, Ray Owen being awarded the Harry Sunderland Trophy as man-of-the-match.

Challenge Cup

In the Challenge Cup Final Featherstone Rovers faced Barrow, who were captain-coached by Jim Challinor at Wembley Stadium on Saturday 13 May 1967 in front of a crowd of 76,290.

Featherstone Rovers won 17-12 and it was their first Cup Final win in two Final appearances.

Other competitions

The BBC2 Floodlit Trophy winners were Castleford who beat Swinton 7-2 in the final. St. Helens won the Lancashire League, and Leeds won the Yorkshire League. Wigan beat Oldham 16–13 to win the Lancashire County Cup, and Hull Kingston Rovers beat Featherstone Rovers 25–12 to win the Yorkshire County Cup.

References

Sources
1966-67 Rugby Football League season at wigan.rlfans.com
The Challenge Cup at The Rugby Football League website

1966 in English rugby league
1967 in English rugby league
Northern Rugby Football League seasons